In the 1962–63 season,  USM Marengo is competing in the Championnat National for the 1st season, as well as the Algerian Cup. They will be competing in Championnat National, and the Algerian Cup.

Competitions

Overview

Critérium d'Honneur

League table

Results by round

Matches

Algerian Cup

Squad information

Playing statistics

Goalscorers
Includes all competitive matches. The list is sorted alphabetically by surname when total goals are equal.

References

USMM Hadjout seasons
Algerian football clubs 1962–63 season